71 Windmill Street, Millers Point is a heritage-listed terrace house located at 71 Windmill Street, in the inner city Sydney suburb of Millers Point in the City of Sydney local government area of New South Wales, Australia. The property was added to the New South Wales State Heritage Register on 2 April 1999.

History 
Millers Point is one of the earliest areas of European settlement in Australia, and a focus for maritime activities. This Victorian two-storey terrace house was constructed during the 1880s, along with a neighbouring building, on the site of the former "Hit or Miss Hotel".

Description 
Two storey, four bedroom Victorian terrace. Infilled balcony with iron lace balustrade and valence on upper storey. Storeys: Two; Construction: Painted rendered masonry, corrugated galvanised iron roof, painted timber joinery. Style: Victorian Italianate.

The external condition of the property is good.

Modifications and dates 
External: Verandah infill.

Heritage listing 
As at 23 November 2000, this terrace house was constructed during the 1880s, along with neighbouring buildings as redevelopment of older buildings.

It is part of the Millers Point Conservation Area, an intact residential and maritime precinct. It contains residential buildings and civic spaces dating from the 1830s and is an important example of C19th adaptation of the landscape.

71 Windmill Street, Millers Point was listed on the New South Wales State Heritage Register on 2 April 1999.

See also 

Australian residential architectural styles
69 Windmill Street
Stevens Terrace

References

Bibliography

Attribution

External links

 
 

New South Wales State Heritage Register sites located in Millers Point
Windmill Street, Millers Point, 71
Terraced houses in Sydney
Articles incorporating text from the New South Wales State Heritage Register
Millers Point, Windmill Street 71
1880s establishments in Australia
Millers Point Conservation Area